Hardly a Criminal is a 1949 Argentine crime drama directed by Hugo Fregonese. It was written by Raimundo Calcagno and Israel Chas de Cruz. The film started the director's Hollywood film directing career. It was re-released in theatres a few times during the 21st century.

In a survey of the 100 greatest films of Argentine cinema carried out by the Museo del Cine Pablo Ducrós Hicken in 2000, the film reached the 10th position. In a new version of the survey organized in 2022 by the specialized magazines La vida útil, Taipei and La tierra quema, presented at the Mar del Plata International Film Festival, the film reached the 27th position.

Plot
After losing his money to gambling, José Moran decides to embezzle a large amount of money from the company that employs him. Moran thinks that he will only be locked up in prison for six years once his employer discovers the embezzlement. He plans to use the money after his term is finished. Six years later, the place where he hid the money is now gone which leads to both the police and criminals trying to find it.

Cast

Production
It was mostly filmed on streets in Buenos Aires. James Mason decided to act in Fregonese's 1950 film One Way Street, when it had the working title Death on a Side Street, once he watched Hardly a Criminal.

Release
The film's producers hoped that it would be successful in the United States with English subtitles. After the film's 1949 showing at the American Academy of Arts and Sciences, the director and his wife Faith Domergue held a party for multiple guests.

In 2014, the film and One Way Street was released at the Noir City: Hollywood, 16th Annual Festival of Film Noir program at the Grauman's Egyptian Theatre. It was a part of the Death is My Dance Partner: Film Noir in Postwar Argentina program, which had six features that were filmed within the time of Peronism (1949–1956), at the Museum of Modern Art in 2016. It was released with 35 mm movie film and a new English dubbing by the UCLA Film and Television Archive's Film Noir Foundation Collection. In 2020, the film was a selection at the 18th Annual San Francisco Film Noir Festival.

Reception
Critics from Buenos Aires in 1949 said that it was Argentina's "outstanding film of the year". The film started the director's Hollywood film directing career. The American Cinematheque said that the film is "the best Argentine noir of the 1940s" and that it "is an audacious blending of Naked City and Brute Force". Nicolas Rapold of Film Comment wrote, "While lacking the snap of American counterparts, its laying bare of masculine pride and familial shame was hard to shake."

References

External links

1949 films
1940s Spanish-language films
Argentine black-and-white films
1949 crime drama films
Films with screenplays by Tulio Demicheli
Argentine crime drama films
Films shot in Buenos Aires
Films directed by Hugo Fregonese